Sarajubala Vidyapith is a secondary and higher secondary educational school in West Bengal, India.

Overview
This school is a non residential and co-educational school. The Student–teacher ratio is approximately 25:1.

See also
Education in India
List of schools in India
Education in West Bengal

References

High schools and secondary schools in West Bengal
Schools in Murshidabad district
Educational institutions established in 1972
1972 establishments in West Bengal